Edward Gunasekara is a Sri Lankan politician, a former member of the Parliament of Sri Lanka and a former government minister.

References

Year of birth missing (living people)
Living people
Members of the 11th Parliament of Sri Lanka
Members of the 12th Parliament of Sri Lanka
Members of the 13th Parliament of Sri Lanka
Members of the 15th Parliament of Sri Lanka
Government ministers of Sri Lanka
United National Party politicians
United People's Freedom Alliance politicians

Deputy minister of Internal Affairs and Wayaba Developments